Liu Jiao may refer to:

Liu Jiao (prince) (died 178 BC), Prince of Chu during the Chinese Han Dynasty
Liu Jiao (diver), Chinese female diver